The Cathay Central Plaza, formerly known as Wang-Xiang Central Plaza, is a 30-story,  skyscraper office building completed in 2000 in Cianjhen District, Kaohsiung, Taiwan. Designed by Liu Associates, this building has a triangular footprint and is topped by a pyramid. It is owned by the Mountain Group, which also owns the Shr-Hwa Financial Center in Kaohsiung. As of February 2021, it is the 24th tallest building in Kaohsiung.

The Hotel
Other than office spaces, the 22nd to 29th floors of the building houses the Hotel Cozzi Zhongshan Kaohsiung. The four-star hotel has a total of 182 rooms including premium suites, themed restaurants, a café. From the Cozzi the Roof Restaurant on the 30th floor, one can overlook the night skyline of the city, including the famous landmark 85 Sky Tower.

See also 
 List of tallest buildings in Taiwan
 List of tallest buildings in Kaohsiung
 Cathay Shi-Wei Financial Center

References

External links
Hotel Cozzi Zhongshan Kaohsiung Official Website 
 Hotel Cozzi Zhongshang Kaohsiung - Tourism Bureau of the Ministry of Transport of the Republic of China 

2000 establishments in Taiwan
Buildings and structures in Kaohsiung
Skyscraper office buildings in Kaohsiung
Skyscraper hotels in Kaohsiung
Office buildings completed in 2000
Hotel buildings completed in 2000